Larkin Branch is a  long 2nd order tributary to the Hyco River in Halifax County, Virginia.

Course
Larkin Branch rises about 0.25 miles southeast of Larrys Store, Virginia, and then flows generally north with curves to join the Hyco River about 2.5 miles south of Omega.

Watershed
Larkin Branch drains  of area, receives about 45.6 in/year of precipitation, has a wetness index of 398.74, and is about 50% forested.

See also
List of rivers of Virginia

References

Rivers of Virginia
Rivers of Halifax County, Virginia
Tributaries of the Roanoke River